Balthasar Moretus or Balthasar I Moretus (23 July 1574 – 6 July 1641) was a Flemish printer and head of the Officina Plantiniana, the printing company established by his grandfather Christophe Plantin in Antwerp in 1555. He was the son of Martina Plantin and Jan Moretus.

Life
Moretus was the son of Jan Moretus and Martina Plantin, daughter of Christophe Plantin. Both of his parents had worked at the Plantin printing business.

Balthasar Moretus was paralysed on his right side. He studied for a few months under Justus Lipsius, but then fell sick and returned home to work in the office. At first he was a proofreader, but soon he took over more responsibilities.  After the death of his father Jan Moretus in 1610, Balthasar took over the company together with his brother Jan II. After the death of Jan II in 1619, Balthazar started a partnership with Jan van Meurs, who was married to a sister of Maria De Sweert, the wife of Jan II Moretus. This lasted until 1629. By that time, Balthasar II Moretus, son of Jan II, was helping his uncle, and would eventually take over the company after his death in 1641. Balthasar I never married. 

When he was the head of the Officina, he continued ordering illustrations from the workshop of engraver Theodore Galle. He also contacted Peter Paul Rubens to design title pages and provide other illustrations. He knew Rubens from his school period and they were lifelong friends. Apart from many book illustrations and designs, Balthasar also ordered 19 portraits from Rubens. Many of those are still preserved in the Plantin-Moretus Museum, and include portraits of Christoffel Plantin, Jan I Moretus and Justus Lipsius. 

Balthasar I Moretus was also responsible for the expansion and completion of the buildings of the company, which now are the Plantin-Moretus Museum. They were built in the Renaissance style, and together with Rubens' house in Baroque style were considered highlights of early seventeenth century civil building in Antwerp. The Museum, both the building and the interior, is now a Unesco World Heritage Site.

Works

This is  a very partial list of the works published during the years that Balthasar I Moretus was leading the Plantin company. Some of them are reprints of works published earlier by the Plantin company of by other companies, but most are first impressions. Until 1616, the books were officially printed by the widow and sons of Jan Moretus: between 1616 and 1618, by Jan and Balthasar Moretus; from 1618 until 1629, both the widow of Jan II and Jan van Meurs may be mentioned as co-printers: between 1629 and 1641, only Balthasar was mentioned.

1613: Balthasar Moretus, Iusti Lipsi sapientiæ et litterarum antistitis fama postuma
1613: Pedro de Ribadeneira, Catalogus scriptorum religionis Societatis Iesu
1613: Thomas Stapleton, Promptuarium morale super Evangelia dominicalia
1613: Missale Romanum, with illustrations by Rubens, reprinted 1618
1613: François d'Aguilon, Opticorum libri sex, with illustrations by Rubens
1614: Seneca the Younger, Opera, quae exstant omnia, with illustrations by Rubens
1614: Justus Lipsius, De militia romana
1614: Leonardus Lessius, Quae fides et religio sit capessenda
1614: Breviarium Romanum, with illustrations by Rubens
1615: Robert Bellarmine, De ascensione mentis in Deum
1617: Leonardus Lessius, De iustitia et iure, with illustrations by Rubens
1620: Henricus Culens, Spiritualium Strenarum ac variarum Concionum manipulus
1620: Robert Bellarmine, De arte bene moriendi
1621: Justus Lipsius, De Vesta et vestalibus syntagma
1621: Litaniae omnium Sanctorum, with engravings by the atelier of Theodore Galle
1622: Aubert Miraeus, De vita Alberti pii, sapientis, prudentis Belgarum principis commentarius
1622: Augustinus Mascardus, Silvarum, with illustrations by Rubens
1622: Henricus Culens, Thesaurus locorum communium, de nova et vetera proferuntur
1624: Biblia Sacra Vulgatae editionis
1626: Balthasar Cordier, Catena Sexaginta quinque Graecorum Patrum in S. Lucam, with illustrations by Rubens
1626: Joannes Malder, Tractatus de sigillo confessionis sacramentalis
1627: Pontificale Romanum iussu Clementis VIII Pont. Max.
1627: Libert Froidmont, Meteorologicorum
1628: Justus Lipsius, De constantia
1630: Balthasar Cordier, Catena patrum graecorum in Sanctum Joannem
1631: Libert Froidmont, Labyrinthus
1631: Erycius Puteanus, Diva virgo Bellifontana in Sequanis: loci ac pietatis descriptio
1631: Edmund Campion, Decem rationes propositae in causa fidei, et opuscula eius selecta
1633: Jodocus à Castro, Conciones super Evangelia dominicalia. Pars Hiemalis
1633: Balthasar Cordier, Opera S. Dionysii Areopagitae, with illustrations by Rubens
1634: Pedro de Bivero, Sacrum oratorium piarum imaginum immaculatae Mariae
1634: Silvester Petra Sancta, De symbolis heroicis
1635: Benedictus van Haeften, Regia via Crucis
1635: Maximilianus ab Eynatten, Manuale exorcismorum
1637: Justus Lipsius, Opera omnia, postremum ab ipso aucta et recensita
1637: Vincentius Guinisius, Lvcensis e Soc. Iesv Poesis
1638: Carolus Neapolis, Anaptyxis ad fastos P. Ovidii Nasonis
1640: Imago primi saeculi Societatis Iesu, celebrating 100 years of the Jesuit congregation

Notes

Sources
Metropolitan Museum: Information on Rubens' involvement with Moretus
Max Rooses, Petrus-Paulus Rubens en Balthasar Moretus. Een bijdrage tot de geschiedenis der Kunst
Leon Voet, The Golden Compasses: the history of the House of Plantin-Moretus chapter 4

Flemish printers
1574 births
1641 deaths
Businesspeople from Antwerp